The English River is a river in Kenora District and Thunder Bay District in Northwestern Ontario, Canada. It flows through Lac Seul to join the Winnipeg River at Tetu Lake as a right tributary. Although there are several hydroelectric plants on this river, the English River upstream of Minnitaki Lake is notable as one of the few large river systems in northwestern Ontario with a natural flow and without any upstream source of pollution. It is the fourth longest river entirely in Ontario.

There is also a settlement on the river called English River, located where Highway 17 crosses the river at its confluence with the Scotch River, along with a nearby railway point of the same name, constructed as part of the Canadian Pacific Railway transcontinental main line.

Geography
The English River forms in Thunder Bay District, just east of English River settlement on the boundary with Kenora District. Flowing north straddling the district boundary until Mattawa Lake, it continues northwest through Minnitaki Lake and passes Sioux Lookout, the largest town along its course. Through Lac Seul, it flows to its mouth at Tetu Lake on the Winnipeg River, which flows via the Nelson River to Hudson Bay. It flows through numerous lakes during its course.

2 non-contiguous segments of the river are protected in 2 separate provincial parks: the East English River Provincial Park and West English River Provincial Park.

Tributaries
Vermilion River
Wabigoon River

Settlements
Settlements along its course are (in upstream order):
Caribou Falls
Ear Falls
Kejick Bay / Lac Seul First Nation
Sioux Lookout
English River

Fauna
The English River is considered as one of the best fisheries in Ontario. Notable trophy fish species include walleye, northern pike, smallmouth bass, and muskellunge. At least 21 fish species have been identified, including sauger, yellow perch, rock bass, cisco, lake whitefish, and mooneye.

Hydroelectricity

There are 4 hydro-electric generating stations on the English River, owned and operated by Ontario Power Generation.

See also
List of longest rivers of Canada
List of Ontario rivers
Ontario Minamata disease

References

Sources

Rivers of Kenora District
Tributaries of Hudson Bay